This is a list of  applications available on Xbox One. Some applications may require subscriptions to Xbox Live, its premium gold service, or a qualifying TV provider and to the respective content.

Exclusivity
 
 Yes = Exclusive only to the Xbox One console.
 Xbox = Exclusive to Microsoft's Xbox platforms.
 Timed = Confirmed as exclusive for a certain period of time, but will become available on other platforms later.
 No = Available to more than one console of this or the previous console generation.

Kinect support

 Yes = Kinect is required for functionality.
 Supported = Kinect is optional, but support for the Kinect is available in the application.
 No = Control is with the controller exclusively.

Extra subscription
 Yes = A separate subscription (from Xbox Live) to a particular service is required for use. This can be to specific television service providers as well as content providers.
 Optional = A separate subscription (from Xbox Live) to a particular service adds functionality.
 No = All features available to all application users.

List

See also
 List of Xbox 360 applications
 List of Xbox One games
 Xbox Live

References

Xbox One software